This is a list of the episodes of Open All Hours, a BBC sitcom created and written by Roy Clarke. Open All Hours stars Ronnie Barker and David Jason as an uncle and nephew who operate a small grocery shop in South Yorkshire. The programme was introduced to television in 1973, as an episode of Seven of One—an anthology series that tested seven television pilots with Barker in the lead role.

The first series of Open All Hours premiered in 1976 on BBC2. The programme returned to television in 1981, this time on BBC1. The final two series also aired on BBC1, in 1982 and 1985 respectively. In all, 25 episodes were broadcast after the pilot, plus a comedy sketch that appeared in a 1982 Christmas special called The Funny Side of Christmas.

The pilot episode was directed by James Gilbert, and all subsequent episodes were directed by Sydney Lotterby. Ronnie Barker died in 2005, but in 2013, BBC1 (which had since rebranded to BBC One) launched a sequel titled Still Open All Hours. Roy Clarke writes the new series, with Dewi Humphreys directing. David Jason reprises his role as Granville, now in charge of the shop.

Series overview

Episodes

Pilot (1973)

The Open All Hours pilot was the first episode of Ronnie Barker's 1973 comedy anthology series, Seven of One. It was one of two episodes that the BBC developed into a series; the other, "Prisoner and Escort", became the BBC1 sitcom Porridge, which premiered in 1974. The first series of Open All Hours began on BBC2 in 1976.

The exterior shots in the main series were filmed at a different location than in the pilot: The corner of Lister Avenue and Scarth Avenue in Doncaster.

Series 1 (1976)

Series 2 (1981)

Series 3 (1982)

Christmas special (1982)
This eight-minute short subject was broadcast as a segment of a 1982 Christmas special called The Funny Side of Christmas. One of the other segments of the programme was devoted to a comedy sketch for Only Fools and Horses, another sitcom in which David Jason co-stars.

Series 4 (1985)

See also

 List of Still Open All Hours episodes
 List of Porridge episodes

References

External links
 
 

BBC-related lists
Lists of British sitcom episodes